Quinak-e Zohari (also Romanized as Qū’īnak-e Zoharī; also known as Qū’īnak-e Jaddeh and Qū’īnak) is a village in Behnampazuki-ye Jonubi Rural District, in the Central District of Varamin County, Tehran Province, Iran. At the 2006 census, its population was 324, in 76 families.

References 

Populated places in Varamin County